General elections were held in Belgium on 13 October 1985. The Christian People's Party emerged as the largest party, with 49 of the 212 seats in the Chamber of Representatives and 25 of the 106 seats in the Senate. Elections to the nine provincial councils were also held.

The incumbent government was a coalition of Christian democrats (CVP/PSC) and liberals (PVV/PRL) led by Prime Minister Wilfried Martens. Following the elections, the same parties formed a new Martens Government. Guy Verhofstadt, PVV leader since 1982, was elected for the first time as representative. Despite PVV being the only governing party to lose seats, he was able to weigh on the government agreement and he became Deputy Prime Minister in the Martens VI Government. The government would fall two years later due to the Voeren issue; distrust of labour unions in Verhofstadt proved to be a factor as well.

Results

Chamber of Representatives

Senate

References

1985 elections in Belgium
October 1985 events in Europe
Belgium